Asteronotus is a genus of sea slugs, dorid nudibranchs, shell-less marine gastropod molluscs in the family Discodorididae.

Species 
Species in the genus Asteronotus include:
 Asteronotus cespitosus van Hasselt, 1824
 Asteronotus hepaticus (Abraham, 1877)
 Asteronotus mabilla (Abraham, 1877)
 Asteronotus mimeticus Gosliner & Valdes, 2002
 Asteronotus raripilosus (Abraham, 1877)
 Asteronotus spongicolus Gosliner & Valdes, 2002
Species brought into synonymy
 Asteronotus bertrana Bergh, L.S.R., 1878: synonym of Asteronotus cespitosus van Hasselt, 1824
 Asteronotus brassica Allan, J.K., 1932: synonym of Asteronotus cespitosus van Hasselt, 1824
 Asteronotus fuscus O'Donoghue, C.H., 1924: synonym of Asteronotus cespitosus van Hasselt, 1824
 Asteronotus hemprichi Ehrenberg, 1831: synonym of Asteronotus cespitosus van Hasselt, 1824
 Asteronotus madrasensis O'Donoghue, C.H., 1932: synonym of Asteronotus cespitosus van Hasselt, 1824
 Asteronotus mabilla Bergh, L.S.R., 1878: synonym of Asteronotus cespitosus van Hasselt, 1824
 Asteronotus trenberthi Burn, 1962: synonym of Sclerodoris trenberthi (Burn, 1962)

References

External links 

Discodorididae
Gastropod genera
Taxa named by Christian Gottfried Ehrenberg